The Bilate is a river of south-central Ethiopia. It is the longest river flowing into Lake Abaya and also the one with the highest discharge. The river is not navigable and it has no notable tributaries. Along the middle of its course the Bilate flows past the Bilate River volcanic field and its most territory covered by Halaba Zone.

David Buxton recorded its importance as defining the boundary between the Sidamo district on the eastern side, and the Wolaita district on the western; he also describes finding a weekly market beside a ford named Dinto.

See also 
 List of rivers of Ethiopia

References 

Rivers of Ethiopia